Ozothamnus tesselatus, commonly known as tesselate everlasting, is a flowering plant in the family Asteraceae. It is a small shrub with woolly branches and globular heads of whitish to straw-coloured flowers.

Description
The leaf upper surface is green, sticky, shiny, rarely roughly textured, dotted with glands and the lower surface light coloured and woolly. Flowering occurs in spring and the fruit is a hairy achene.

Taxonomy and naming
This ozothamnus was described in 1896 by Joseph Maiden and Richard Thomas Baker and given the name Helichrysum tesselatum. In 1991 Arne A. Anderberg changed the name to Ozothamnus tesselatus and the description was published in Opera Botanica.

Distribution and habitat
Tesselate everlasting has a restricted distribution, growing in woodland north of Rylstone.

References

tesselatus
Asterales of Australia
Flora of New South Wales
Taxa named by Joseph Maiden
Taxa named by Richard Thomas Baker
Plants described in 1896